Cloudy with a Chance of Meatballs is a children's book written by Judi Barrett and illustrated by Ron Barrett. It was first published in 1978 by Atheneum Books, followed by a 1982 trade paperback edition from sister company Aladdin Paperbacks. It is now published by Simon & Schuster. Based on a 2007 online poll, the National Education Association listed the book as one of its "Teachers' Top 100 Books for Children". It was one of the "Top 100 Picture Books" of all time in a 2012 poll by School Library Journal.

A sequel, Pickles to Pittsburgh, was published in 1997 by Atheneum Books; a hardcover edition followed in 2009. A second sequel, Planet of the Pies, was published on August 27, 2013.

Plot
Inspired by an incident while making pancakes at breakfast, a grandfather tells a bedtime story, chronicling the lives of the citizens of an imaginary town called Chewandswallow, which is characterized by food raining from the sky. The grandchildren are named Henry and Kate, though the narrating girl is not named until the sequel.

As the story goes; Chewandswallow was mostly like any average small town but because the sky provided all the food, the town was devoid of food stores.  Unlike typical weather, the weather over Chewandswallow always consisted of food, and came three times a day, at breakfast, lunch, and dinnertime. The town also had a sanitation department; a food-cleaning service that would clean up food left over. It also fed the fallen food to the dogs, cats, land wildlife and sealife, and also used other leftovers to enrich garden soil. For the residents of Chewandswallow, this was a much better arrangement.

Life was happy in the town of Chewandswallow; but, suddenly, the weather took the townspeople in a turn for the worse. The weather began to create problems for the town with events such as a flood of spaghetti creating a tangle in a traffic intersection, Gorgonzola cheese raining down for a whole day, and a pea soup fog.

The food began to increase in size and started creating natural disasters, such as a hurricane of hard bread and rolls that damaged buildings and filled the seaside bay, after which it took the town weeks to clean up.

Another disaster was a colossal pancake and syrup storm, during which a gigantic pancake covered the whole school and was impossible to remove, leading the school to be permanently closed.

A few days later, there came a 15 inch drift of cream cheese and jam sandwiches that gave everyone indigestion and next day brought a salt and pepper wind accompanied by a tomato tornado.

Before long, the Sanitation department service had to cease operation as they were unable to handle the continuous deluge of oversized, unappetizing food. With no way to stop the weather, the townspeople had no choice but to abandon Chewandswallow in order to survive. The people constructed boats out of stale bread cemented together sandwich-style with peanut butter, gathered all their belongings and set sail to find a new home. They eventually found a new town and used the extra bread to make new houses. The citizens, in their new town, got used to having real rain and snow as well as buying food at supermarkets instead of from the sky, while their children began school again. And they never returned to Chewandswallow, being too afraid.

Kate and Henry fall asleep shortly after their grandfather finishes his story. The book ends with the grandchildren waking up to a snow day. While they sled down the hill, they imagine that the snow-covered hilltop with the sun rising is mashed potatoes with butter on the top.

Sequels
The follow up to the story, Pickles to Pittsburgh, released on October 1, 1997, tells of the kids receiving a postcard from their grandfather, who claims to be visiting the ruins of what was once the fabled town of Chewandswallow. The kids then go to sleep and dream that they are there with him, helping to rebuild the post-apocalyptic landscape and restore it to where it is livable again, as well as giving the massive amounts of food away to poverty-stricken developing nations and homeless shelters around the world. This proves to be difficult, as there could be more food storms on the way.

A third book in the series, Cloudy with a Chance of Meatballs 3: Planet of the Pies, was released on August 27, 2013. It details a dream Grandpa had about the first crewed expedition to Mars, where Martian society is being overrun by daily storms of pies.

Film adaptations

On September 18, 2009, Sony Pictures Animation released an animated film adaptation of the book, and the DVD was released on January 5, 2010. A new cast of characters were created for plot development, while the synopsis was changed from food falling from skies from meteorology to being made from a machine. Bill Hader and Anna Faris provided the voices of the two lead characters. Hader voices Flint Lockwood, "a young inventor who dreams of creating something that will improve everyone's life." Faris provides the voice for Samantha "Sam" Sparks, "a weathergirl covering the situation who hides her intelligence behind a perky exterior." James Caan, Bruce Campbell, Mr. T, Andy Samberg, Neil Patrick Harris, Bobb'e J. Thompson, Benjamin Bratt, Al Roker, Lauren Graham, and Will Forte are also on the voice cast. Co-writers and co-directors Philip Lord and Chris Miller said that it would be a homage to, and a parody of, disaster movies such as Twister, Armageddon, and The Day After Tomorrow, as well as Sony's then-upcoming 2012, released nearly two months later.

Unlike the book where a grandfather tells his two grandchildren a bedtime story about Chewandswallow, an inventor named Flint Lockwood, who lives in Swallow Falls (Chewandswallow's original name before the food weather), invents a machine that turns the water vapor in the atmosphere into food. Originally the phenomenon was limited to Swallow Falls, but overuse of the machine causes it to malfunction and the food weather taking a turn for the worse, as well as spreading it across the world. A sequel to the film, titled Cloudy with a Chance of Meatballs 2, was released on September 27, 2013, however, it is based on an original idea, and not Pickles to Pittsburgh.

Game

In conjunction with the September 18, 2009 film release, Ubisoft released a game for Nintendo DS, PC, PlayStation 3, PlayStation Portable, Wii, and Xbox 360, as well as a stereoscopic online mini game.

References

1978 children's books
American picture books
Atheneum Books books
Children's books adapted into films
Cloudy with a Chance of Meatballs (franchise)
Tall tales